The Girl in Black Stockings is an American B-movie mystery film released by United Artists in 1957. Directed by Howard W. Koch, it stars Lex Barker, Anne Bancroft, and Mamie Van Doren.

Plot
A lodge in Kanab, Utah, is where Los Angeles lawyer David Hewson goes for a peaceful vacation. He quickly is attracted to Beth Dixon, a switchboard operator and a former personal assistant to lodge owner Edmund Parry.

The murder of playgirl Marsha Morgan, her throat cut, disrupts the peace and quiet. Sheriff Holmes begins the investigation, starting with the wheelchair-using Parry, who admits to hating the dead woman, and Parry's possessive sister Julia, who helps him run the lodge. It turns out David once dated Morgan as well.

A new guest, Joseph Felton, checks in. The sheriff's suspects also include guests Norman Grant, a drunken actor, and his ambitious girlfriend, Harriet Ames. A missing kitchen knife believed to be the murder weapon is found by Indian Joe, who works at the lodge.

Beth eavesdrops on a phone call Felton makes from his room. She overhears him speaking to a man named Prentiss. Felton is later found killed by a gunshot, and it turns out he was a private detective. David becomes more and more convinced that the Parrys are behind all this. Ames is seen kissing Edmund Parry, which does not please Edmund's sister or Grant.

To his shock, David arrives as Beth holds a knife to Julia Parry's bloody throat, claiming to have stabbed her in self-defense. It turns out, however, that Prentiss is Beth's husband, and he had hired the investigator Felton to follow the psychologically disturbed Beth, who is responsible for all the murders.

Cast of characters

 Lex Barker as David Hewson
 Anne Bancroft as Beth
 Mamie Van Doren as Harriet Ames
 John Dehner as Sheriff Holmes
 Ron Randell as Edmund Parry
 Marie Windsor as Julia Parry
 John Holland as Norman Grant
 Diana Vandervlis as Louise Miles
 Richard Cutting as Dr. Aiken
 Larry Chance as Joe
 Gene O'Donnell as Felton
 Norman Leavitt as Amos
 Gerald Frank as Frankie
 Stuart Whitman as Prentiss
 David Dwight as Judge Walters
 Karl MacDonald as Deputy
 Dan Blocker as Bartender
 Mark Bennett as Brackett

Production
The movie's working title was Black Stockings. It was filmed on location in the small Utah city of Kanab; the lodge in the film is the real-life Parry Lodge in Kanab, which had often served to house movie crews filming in the area. Filming also took place at Three Lakes and the Moqui Cave in Utah as well as Fredonia, Arizona.

The Girl in Black Stockings was Van Doren's first film after the birth of her son and her consequent release from Universal.

Production began in July 1956.

Like much of Bel-Air's output, The Girl in Black Stockings was a low-budget exploitation film released as a second feature.

Turner Classic Movies showing
Turner Classic Movies presented The Girl in Black Stockings on September 17, 2015, in commemoration of what would have been Anne Bancroft's 84th birthday. Shown after The Girl in Black Stockings was 1957's Nightfall, 1964's The Pumpkin Eater, 1966's 7 Women, 1975's The Prisoner of Second Avenue, and 1984's Garbo Talks.

See also
 List of American films of 1957

References

External links
 
 
 Review of film at Variety
 The Girl in Black Stockings at TV Guide (revised form of this 1987 write-up was originally published in The Motion Picture Guide)

1957 films
Film noir
1950s mystery films
American crime drama films
American black-and-white films
Films directed by Howard W. Koch
Films shot in Utah
Films set in Utah
Films shot in Arizona
United Artists films
1950s English-language films
1950s American films